Winnipeg is a very large city in Canada and the capital of the province of Manitoba.

Winnipeg may also refer to:
Winnipeg (electoral district), a former federal electoral district in Manitoba, Canada
Lake Winnipeg, a large lake in Manitoba
Winnipeg River, a river flowing into Lake Winnipeg
Winnipeg Capital Region, Manitoba, a region of Manitoba in the Red River Valley
Winnipeg Junction, Minnesota, a community in the United States
Winnipeg, Missouri, a community in the United States
Winnipeg (bear), a Canadian black bear and the namesake for Winnie the Pooh
, a Canadian frigate.
Winnipeg (ship), the name of a ship which arrived at Valparaíso, Chile, on 3 September 1939 with 2,200 Spanish immigrants